ICM Partners is a talent and literary agency with offices in Los Angeles, New York City, Washington D.C. and London. ICM (International Creative Management) Partners represents clients in the fields of motion pictures, television, music, publishing, live performance, branded entertainment and new media. Its corporate headquarters are in Constellation Place in Century City, Los Angeles.

History
ICM was formed in 1975 through the merger of Creative Management Associates and International Famous Agency. In 2005, the company raised a financing round of $75 million from Rizvi Traverse.

In 2006, ICM acquired the literary agency Broder Webb Chervin Silbermann.

In 2012, the agency completed a management buyout and formed a partnership with the new name, ICM Partners.

In March 2018, ICM acquired the Just For Laughs comedy festival, as part of a partnership with Howie Mandel. A 51% majority was later sold to Bell Media and Groupe CH to maintain a primarily-Canadian ownership. In June that year, ICM formed a partnership with esports-focused talent agency Evolved.

In December 2019, ICM Partners sold a one-third equity stake in the company to Crestview Partners, with the expressed goal to grow the company within the representation business with an emphasis on International growth.

In March 2020, ICM partnered with Primary Talent International, a London based music touring agency with over 700 touring clients. In August, they bought a significant minority interest in Albatros, a literary agency based in Stockholm and moved partner Pete Stone to Sweden to run ICM Europe. In October, the agency purchased Stellar Group, the largest football/soccer agency in the world and rebranded it ICM Stellar Sports.

Stellar Group CEO Jonathan Barnett was listed by Forbes as the #1 sports agent in the world by Forbes magazine in 2019.

In July 2021, ICM Partners and ICM Stellar Sports purchased one of the leading NFL representation agencies, Select Sports Group, a Texas based company headed up by Jeff Nalley and Erik Burkhardt.

In September 2021, it was announced that ICM would be acquired by Creative Artists Agency (CAA). The deal closed in June 2022 at a value of $750 million. Following the acquisition, 105 positions from ICM were set to be eliminated, with about 425 staffers and agents joining CAA.

Departments

Television and movies
ICM Partners' television and motion picture departments represent film actors, actresses, directors and writers. The departments also feature a division dedicated to production professionals such as cinematographers, editors, 2nd unit directors, composers, production designers, costume designers and visual effects supervisors. The television department also represents on-air and creative talent.

Publishing
ICM Partners represents writers and editors including Patricia Cornwell, Thomas Friedman, Anna Quindlen, E.L. Doctorow, Walter Isaacson, Carl Hiaasen, Tom Bissell, Anthony Swofford, Chris Cleave, Candace Bushnell, John Feinstein, Ann Patchett, Carol Higgins Clark and Steve Martin. In addition, the agency represents the estates of Theodor Geisel (Dr. Seuss), Arthur Miller, E.B. White, and Tennessee Williams, among others.

Music, comedy, and lectures
ICM Partners' concert and live appearances department represents artists in music and comedy as well as lecturers. ICM Partners acquired New York City speakers agency, Royce Carlton, Inc., in 2017. From the acquisition until late 2019, the lecture division still went by the Royce Carlton name. On October 16, 2019, the division rebranded to ICM Speakers and relocated to the Washington, DC office. ICM Speakers' division services include the management and representation of professional public speakers. A few notable clients include author Mitch Albom, author Jon Meacham, TV host Karamo Brown, and activist Nadia Murad.

Branded entertainment
ICM Partners' global branded entertainment division's services range from celebrity endorsements, product placement and music tour sponsorship to brand integration, such as the creation and packaging of original branded films and television shows. The agency's celebrity endorsements department services all ICM Partners' film and television talent for on-camera, print and voiceover commercial work as well as for paid media campaigns.

References

External links

 

Talent and literary agencies
Entertainment companies based in California
Companies based in Los Angeles
Entertainment companies established in 1975
1975 establishments in California
Privately held companies of the United States